The Drug Trafficking Act 1994 (c. 37) is an Act of the Parliament of the United Kingdom. It largely replaced the Drug Trafficking Offences Act 1986.

Where the defendant is convicted of a drug trafficking offence and the  prosecutor applies to the  Crown Court for a confiscation order the court must determine whether the defendant has benefited from drug trafficking.

If at any time the defendant has received any payment or other reward in connection with drug trafficking carried out by him or another he will be deemed to have benefited from drug trafficking and the court must make a confiscation order.  The Drug Trafficking Act 1994 came into force on 3 February 1995 and any benefit received by the defendant in connection with drug trafficking prior to that date must be included when calculating the defendant's benefit.

The Act embraces 69 sections and is divided into 4 Parts with 3 schedules

External links

United Kingdom Acts of Parliament 1994